Higginsville is a rural community of the Halifax Regional Municipality in the Canadian province of Nova Scotia. The area was settled in 1783 by John Higgins and his wife Hester Carmichael. John was from Wiltshire, England and served with the British Army in the 70th Regiment of Foot as a Genadiere in the American Revolutionary War, and subsequently granted 60 acres of land in Shelburne (Port Roseway), Nova Scotia. The land in Port Roseway was very rocky and not fit for farming; he and his wife traveled along the coast until they came to the Musquodoboit River which they followed inland. Hester was pregnant and when they reached the area now known as Higginsville, they spent the night and their first child was born. John and Hester found the area to be good for farming and remained there to raise their family.

Navigator

References
Explore HRM

Communities in Halifax, Nova Scotia
General Service Areas in Nova Scotia